The Sharjah Art Foundation is a contemporary art and cultural foundation based in Sharjah, the United Arab Emirates, founded in 2009 by Hoor Al Qasimi, daughter of Sultan bin Muhammad Al-Qasimi, a member of the Supreme Council of the United Arab Emirates and current ruler of Sharjah, to support artists and artistic practice in the Sharjah communities, the UAE, and the region via different platforms that include Sharjah Biennial, the annual March Meeting, art residencies, production grants, commissions, art exhibitions, artistic research and publications. The foundation include exhibitions featuring the work of Arab and international artists, performances, music, film screenings, artist talks, and educational for a range or audience from children to adults. The Sharjah Art foundation strives to promote public learning and participating in art practices.

Sharjah Biennial 
Sharjah Biennial is an international art exhibition that takes place in Sharjah, United Arab Emirates, once every two years. The first International Sharjah Biennial took place in 1993 under the organization of Sharjah Department of Culture and Information and later transferred to Sharjah Art Foundation, for management and organization since its creation in 2009. A Biennial Prize is awarded at the end of each exhibition by a jury of renowned art world figures.

March Meeting 
March Meeting is an annual gathering of international art practitioners and art institutions in the region. It is organized by Sharjah Art Foundation and was launched in 2008, to encourage regional art professionals to connect, partner and share ideas in the sphere of contemporary art.

Buildings 
As well as constructing Rain Room, a permanent home for the experiential artwork by art collective Random International, Sharjah Art Foundation has reconstructed and made significant additions to The Flying Saucer, Sharjah as well as to the Al Jubail Vegetable Market, the 1970s era Khor Fakkan Cinema, which is being redeveloped as a music school and a pyramid-roofed kindergarten which is being made into a community centre. In 2023 it opened Kalba Ice Factory, a redevelopment of a disused feed mill and ice factory in Kalba, on Sharjah's East Coast.

Exhibition 
List of notable exhibitions organized by Sharjah Art Foundation:

See also 
 Emirati Artists

References

External links 
 Official Website

Arab art scene
Organisations based in the Emirate of Sharjah
Organisations based in Sharjah (city)